Bleem! (styled as bleem!) was a commercial PlayStation emulator released by the Bleem! Company in 1999 for IBM-compatible PCs and Dreamcast. It is notable for being one of the few commercial software emulators to be aggressively marketed during the emulated console's lifetime, and was the center of multiple controversial lawsuits.

History
Bleem! was a PlayStation emulator designed to allow people to play original PlayStation games on their PC or Dreamcast gaming consoles (the Dreamcast version was called Bleemcast!). It was released in March 1999. The company that developed and commercialized Bleem! initially consisted of just two people, David Herpolsheimer (president) and Randy Linden, but in the commercial phase included Will Kempe, Scott Karol, Sean Kauppinen, Bryan Stokes, James Sinclair, and Paul Chen, later of Rovio Entertainment.

Context
To allow for full-speed emulation on even lower-end computers of what was at the time a current generation console, the authors coded Bleem! in assembly. This allowed them to create precise optimizations.  Unlike Connectix's commercial Virtual Game Station, it made use of a PC's 3D graphics hardware for rendering, allowing for enhanced resolutions and filtered textures not possible on real hardware.

Bleem! used low-level memory emulation and other real-mode technology. It did not function on operating systems using the Windows NT kernel, including Windows 2000.  In fact, Bleem!'s statement at the time was that Bleem! would never support running on Windows NT-based systems, as Windows 98 was the dominant operating system at the time.

Sony, despite having lost its case with Connectix, continued to pursue legal action against Bleem!. Bleem!, financially unable to defend itself, was forced to go out of business.

As of 2005, two members of the team were working for Sony: Randy Linden was working for SCEA on porting titles and looking at the possibility of emulation of previous generation titles for the next PlayStation, and Sean Kauppinen was promoting EverQuest II and Star Wars Galaxies for Sony Online Entertainment.

Copy protection
To combat redistribution of the small downloadable emulator, the user had to buy the Bleem!-CD, containing about 35 MB of data: a DirectX distributable and the actual version of Bleem! available at the time of the CD's printing.  The rest of the CD was only for copy protection and was impossible to copy by conventional means; nevertheless, the copy protection was cracked within two weeks of the release.

Further updates to the emulator were free until the company ceased operation several years later.

Bleemcast! 

Bleemcast! is an independently developed commercial emulator by Bleem! that allows one to load and play PlayStation discs on the Sega Dreamcast. It is compatible with most Dreamcast controllers and steering wheels, and leverages the Dreamcast's superior processing power for enhanced graphics. It was created by using the MIL-CD security hole found in the Dreamcast BIOS.

History
Originally, Bleem! was planning to have the disc able to run any PlayStation game on the Dreamcast, but due to technical difficulties, they developed the concept of the "Bleempak", in which the software would boot only 100 specific games each. New Bleempaks would have to be purchased if one game was not available to boot in a Bleempak. Due to the Dreamcast controller's fewer buttons compared to the PlayStation, there were plans to release a Bleem! controller somewhat similarly designed to the PlayStation controller, and a PlayStation-to-Dreamcast controller adapter, which would allow one to use a PlayStation controller on the Dreamcast. As technical difficulties grew further, all these ideas were scrapped, with no "Bleempak" and no hardware releases.

However, they managed to release individual Bleemcast! bootdiscs for three popular games: Gran Turismo 2, Tekken 3, and Metal Gear Solid. WWF SmackDown! was also being planned for a release, but was not completed, while a couple of screenshots of Final Fantasy IX were surfacing during this time, but was never announced as a planned release. As promised from the beginning, the games ran in a 640×480 resolution, as opposed to the PS1's 320×240 resolution, and featured anti-aliasing and bilinear filtering. This drastically improved the games' graphics, but also brought out some graphical imperfections that were originally hidden in the lower resolution.

Sony lawsuit
Two days after Bleem! started taking preorders for their emulator, Sony filed suit over violations of copyright. Sony had accused Bleem! of engaging in unfair competition by allowing PlayStation BIOSs to be used on a personal computer as this would ultimately damage Sony's sales of the PlayStation. The Judge had rejected the notion, and issued a protective order to "protect David from Goliath". Sony's second copyright allegation regarded the use of screenshots on their advertisements comparing the native PlayStation and emulated Bleem! versions. The district court had held in favor of Sony regarding the allegation and issued a preliminary injunction against Bleem!; however, Bleem! later appealed the decision providing their use of copyrighted material was protected under fair use. The appeal was successful, with the court stating that the use of screenshots of Sony's video games rather constituted comparative advertising.

In spite of the loss, the release of the Bleemcast! caused Sony to file another lawsuit accusing them of unfair competition and patent infringement regarding the use of PlayStation BIOSs on the Sega Dreamcast. This approach had become problematic for Bleem!, despite no actual court ruling against them. The main issue regarded the financial problems Bleem! had faced as they had to deal with defense costs of $1 million per patent. This had caused Bleem!'s work to decline, so that they had only managed to release three games: Metal Gear Solid, Gran Turismo 2, and Tekken 3, for the Bleemcast!. At this point, Sony had obstructed Bleem! from developing further video games for the Bleemcast! and had even threatened retailers selling these products.

The legal fees forced the company out of business and eBay auctions of some of the company's possessions were held soon after – including a huge library of worldwide game releases used for compatibility testing.

Closure of Bleem!
Although Sony ultimately did not win any of its lawsuits against them, Bleem! had to shut down when the huge court costs became too much for the small company to handle. Bleem! shut down in November 2001, the same year Sega announced that they would discontinue the Dreamcast in North America. Bleem! closed their website, with only an image on their front page showing Sonic the Hedgehog tearfully holding a flower next to a Bleem! gravestone. The image was later altered and Sonic was removed, ironically to avoid a lawsuit from Sega. Sega themselves had also been indirectly involved in the obstruction of Bleemcast! by the way of the removal of the unpopular (for Sega's intended use) MIL-CD format.

Beta leak
A beta build of Bleemcast! was eventually leaked. Even though it was buggy and incomplete, it would run some PlayStation games, though not all the games it ran would be playable. Using this beta, hackers were able to create "Bleemed games" – discs of a PlayStation title with the Bleemcast! emulator built in. ISO images of many of these discs circulate on file-sharing networks.

After the leak, Rod Maher, one of the developers of Bleemcast!, made a public statement regarding the beta, providing some insight into the development process. He revealed that the leaked beta predated the beta that had been shown at E3 and that the leaked beta was 30% complete. The commercial Bleemcast! release was notable as the only release on the Dreamcast that had not been pirated, as it had a complex copy-protection scheme. All three Bleempaks were finally cracked and made available online in December 2009, eight years after their introduction.

Bleem Powered
On January 4, 2021, Piko Interactive announced that they had acquired the Bleem! brand name, with plans to start a retrogaming-focused online storefront titled Bleem Powered, which as of late 2022 still seems to be under development.

References

PlayStation emulators
Dreamcast emulation software
Assembly language software
Sony litigation
Video game controversies
Windows emulation software
Proprietary video game console emulators